Henry Home, Lord Kames (27 December 1782) was a Scottish writer, philosopher and judge who played a major role in Scotland's Agricultural Revolution. A central figure of the Scottish Enlightenment, he was a founding member of the Philosophical Society of Edinburgh and active in The Select Society. Home acted as patron to some of the most influential thinkers of the Scottish Enlightenment, including philosopher David Hume, economist Adam Smith, writer James Boswell, philosopher William Cullen and naturalist John Walker.

Life

Henry Home was born  at Kames House, Berwickshire, between Eccles and Birgham. The son of George Home, he was homeschooled by a private tutor until the age of 16. In 1712, Home was apprenticed as a lawyer under a Writer to the Signet in Edinburgh, and was called to the Scottish bar as an advocate bar in 1724. He soon acquired reputation by a number of publications on the civil and Scottish law, and was one of the leaders of the Scottish Enlightenment. In 1752, he was "raised to the bench", thus acquiring the title of Lord Kames.

Kames held an interest in the development and production of linen in Scotland. Kames was one of the original proprietors of the British Linen Company, serving as a director of the company from 1754 to 1756. Kames was on the panel of judges in the Knight v. Wedderburn case which ruled that slavery was illegal in Scotland. In 1775, he lived in a townhouse in Canongate. The house was located the head of the street's east side, facing onto the Canongate. He is buried in the Home-Drummond plot at Kincardine-in-Menteith west of Blair Drummond.

Writings
Home wrote much about the importance of property to society. In his Essay Upon Several Subjects Concerning British Antiquities, written just after the Jacobite rising of 1745, he showed that the politics of Scotland were based not on loyalty to Kings, as the Jacobites had said, but on the royal land grants that lay at the base of feudalism, the system whereby the sovereign maintained "an immediate hold of the persons and property of his subjects".

In Historical Law Tracts Home described a four-stage model of social evolution that became "a way of organizing the history of Western civilization". The first stage was that of the hunter-gatherer, wherein families avoided each other as competitors for the same food. The second was that of the herder of domestic animals, which encouraged the formation of larger groups but did not result in what Home considered a true society. No laws were needed at these early stages except those given by the head of the family, clan, or tribe. Agriculture was the third stage, wherein new occupations such as "plowman, carpenter, blacksmith, stonemason" made "the industry of individuals profitable to others as well as to themselves", and a new complexity of relationships, rights, and obligations required laws and law enforcers. A fourth stage evolved with the development of market towns and seaports, "commercial society", bringing yet more laws and complexity but also providing more benefit. Lord Kames could see these stages within Scotland itself, with the pastoral Highlands, the agricultural Lowlands, the "polite" commercial towns of Glasgow and Edinburgh, and in the Western Isles a remaining culture of rude huts where fishermen and gatherers of seaweed eked out their subsistence living.

Home was a polygenist, he believed God had created different races on earth in separate regions. In his book Sketches of the History of Man, in 1774, Home claimed that the environment, climate, or state of society could not account for racial differences, so that the races must have come from distinct, separate stocks.

The above studies created the genre of the story of civilization and defined the fields of anthropology and sociology and therefore the modern study of history for two hundred years.

In the popular book Elements of Criticism (1762) Home interrogated the notion of fixed or arbitrary rules of literary composition, and endeavoured to establish a new theory based on the principles of human nature. The late eighteenth-century tradition of sentimental writing was associated with his notion that 'the genuine rules of criticism are all of them derived from the human heart. Prof Neil Rhodes has argued that Lord Kames played a significant role in the development of English as an academic discipline in the Scottish Universities.

Social milieu
He enjoyed intelligent conversation and cultivated a large number of intellectual associates, among them John Home, David Hume and James Boswell.. Lord Monboddo was also a frequent debater of Kames, although these two usually had a fiercely competitive and adversarial relationship.

Family
He was married to Agatha Drummond of Blair Drummond. Their children included George Drummond-Home.

Major works
Remarkable Decisions of the Court of Session (1728)
Essays upon Several Subjects in Law (1732)
Essay Upon Several Subjects Concerning British Antiquities (c. 1745)
Essays on the Principles of Morality and Natural Religion (1751) He advocates the doctrine of philosophical necessity.
Historical Law-Tracts (1758)
Principles of Equity (1760)
Introduction to the Art of Thinking (1761)
Elements of Criticism (1762) Published by two Scottish booksellers, Andrew Millar and Alexander Kincaid.
Elucidations Respecting the Common and Statute Law of Scotland (1777)
Sketches of the History of Man (1774)
Gentleman Farmer (1776)
Loose Thoughts on Education (1781)

See also
George Anderson (minister)

Literature

References

External links

 
 Henry Home, Lord Kames at James Boswell – a Guide

1696 births
1782 deaths
18th-century philosophers
18th-century Scottish historians
People from Berwickshire
Members of the Faculty of Advocates
Enlightenment philosophers
Members of the Philosophical Society of Edinburgh
Scottish rhetoricians
People of the Scottish Enlightenment
Scottish philosophers
Kames
Scottish legal writers
Scottish agronomists
Scottish literary critics
Scottish anthropologists
Scottish sociologists
Alumni of the University of Edinburgh